Langlo is a locality in the Shire of Murweh, Queensland, Australia.

History 
The locality was named and bounded on 28 March 2002.

References 

Shire of Murweh
Localities in Queensland